Heledd Fychan (born 20 September 1980) is a Welsh politician and is the current director of policy and political education for Plaid Cymru. She was elected to the Senedd for the South Wales Central region in May 2021.

Early life
Fychan is originally from Anglesey, and attended Ysgol Gynradd Talwrn and Ysgol Gyfun David Hughes. She studied History and Political Science at Trinity College Dublin, becoming Education Office for Trinity College Dublin's Student Union in 2003-2004, and Education Officer for the Union of Students in Ireland in 2004-2005.

After completing a Masters in Medieval History at Bangor University, Fychan worked for the Plaid Cymru group in London. From 2009 to 2021, she worked for National Museum Wales. In 2016, she was elected to the Board of the Museums Association, becoming Chair of their Nations and Ethics Committees.

Political career

In May 2017, Fychan was elected for Pontypridd Town ward on Rhondda Cynon Taf County Borough Council and also Pontypridd Town Council. She was the second candidate for the party's North Wales Regional Constituency at the 2011 National Assembly for Wales election. She also stood as a candidate for Montgomeryshire in the 2010 United Kingdom general election.

As a local councillor, Fychan has been a vocal community activist. In 2017 she successfully campaigned to reopen Mill Street Post Office and in 2018 she campaigned to save the Muni Arts Centre in Pontypridd, of which she was a volunteer trustee. In 2020 she dealt with severe flooding in Pontypridd and led calls for an independent inquiry.

Senedd
Fychan was selected in May 2020 to be the Plaid Cymru candidate for the Pontypridd constituency for the 2021 Senedd election. She came second in the election, behind Labour's Mick Antoniw, with 22.4% of the vote but was elected to the Senedd from the South Wales Central regional list.

Following the election Fychan became Plaid Cymru's spokesperson on culture, sport and international affairs. In December 2021, Fychan also became the spokesperson for children and young people, and the Welsh language. In October 2022, she was elected by Party members as Plaid Cymru's Director of Policy and Political Education, a role she previously held in 2013.

Personal life
Fychan is married and has a son, as well as two step-children. She lives in Pontypridd.

References 

1980 births
Living people
Plaid Cymru councillors
Welsh women activists
Plaid Cymru members of the Senedd
Wales MSs 2021–2026
Female members of the Senedd
Welsh-speaking politicians